Dongusaurus is an extinct genus of therocephalian therapsids.

See also
 List of therapsids

References

 The main groups of non-mammalian synapsids at Mikko's Phylogeny Archive

Baurioids
Therocephalia genera
Triassic synapsids of Europe
Triassic synapsids of Africa
Triassic synapsids of Asia
Fossil taxa described in 1964